Pristine, meaning unsullied, or unmodified from a natural state, may also refer to:

 Bruise Pristine, 1995 song by Placebo
 Pristine Smut, 1997 album by The Murmurs
 Pristine (band), Norwegian blues rock band
 Pristine (company), software company
 Pristine apple, hybrid cultivar 
 Pristine Audio, music company
 Pristine Crayfish, North American crayfish
 Priştine Detachment, Ottoman Empire military unit

See also
 Pristina, the capital of Kosovo